Sellingen (Gronings: Zèlng ) is a village in the Dutch province of Groningen. In 2021, statistical area "Sellingen", which also includes the surrounding countryside, had a population of 1,880, and the village of Sellingen had 1,045.

Overview 
Sellingen was founded in the 12th century on a sandy ridge along the River . The church dates from the 1300s, however a church in Sellingen was already mentioned around 1150 on a list of possession of the Diocese of Osnabrück. In the 15th century, the Ter Apel Monastery was part of the parish of Sellingen. 

In 1665, the bishop of Münster secretly constructed a road through the moor from Walchum in Lower Saxony to Sellingen as part of a planned invasion of Groningen. At neighbouring Jipsinghuizen, the Münster Army was attacked by the Dutch Republic, and  had to retreat after the Battle of Jipsinghuizen. The road was removed afterwards. 

Around 1750, the first school was built in Sellingen. In October 1964, a road was opened between Sellingen and Walchum. Despite protests by both municipalities, the border remained fenced off, because Germany did not want to establish a border post.

Sellingen used to be part of the municipality of Bourtange. In 1821, it became part of Vlagtwedde. Many people desired a more central location of the municipal council. In 1889, the council voted to move the seat to Sellingen. In 2017, Vlagtwedde merged into Westerwolde, however Sellingen is still one of the two seats.

Nature 
There was still a raised bog to the west of Sellingen. In the 1930s, the heath was cultivated, however  of forest remained, and is known as the Sellingerbossen. It is somewhat random landscape with forests, meadows and swamps, and is known for its variety of damselflies.

Notable people 
 Geert Meijer (born 1951), footballer
 Anke de Vries (born 1936), children's book author

Gallery

References

External links 

Populated places in Groningen (province)
Westerwolde (municipality)